Tomás Chávez Morado (December 29, 1914 – December 21, 2001) was an artist from Silao, Guanajuato, Mexico. He taught at public schools, the Instituto Nacional de Bellas Artes y Literatura, and the Escuela de Artes Plásticas at the Universidad de Guanajuato, where he served as the director of the School of Visual Arts. His civic installations include El Paraguas and the national shield carving displayed at the National Museum of Anthropology in Mexico City as well as 260 monumental eagle head sculptures marking the route of Hidalgo the Liberator (see Miguel Hidalgo y Costilla).  According to Mexican Life, Mexico's Monthly Review, the work of Chávez Morado "creates visions of typical life in the streets, images of people one might find in the markets, at the ferias or inside the tenement patios, with a thematic emphasis on love and the mother and child."

Life
Tomás was one of four children born to José Ignacio Chávez Montes de Oca, a shop keeper, and María de la Luz Morado Cabrera, an amateur painter. His three brothers include José Chávez Morado, Gabriel, and Salvador (who died as a young boy). His mother and maternal uncles who drew sketches were among his first examples of artists. His father also encouraged his creativity by providing him with materials to practice. During the 1918 flu pandemic, also known as the “Spanish flu,” his mother, María de la Luz Cabrera Morado, fell ill and died from influenza. José Ignacio Chávez Montes de Oca remarried and started a new family while his sisters cared for Tomás and his brothers. While in the care of their paternal aunts who often sang, played guitar, and painted, Tomás and José both took a greater interest in art. Tomás completed his primary school education. During this time he worked in his father's grocery store, where it appeared that he might become a merchant like his father. Tomás felt that this type of work seemed "tedious, enslaving, and boring" and instead immersed himself in the libraries of his paternal grandfather and of the father-in-law of José Ignacio Chávez Montes de Oca. At one point he also worked for the father-in-law of José Ignacio Chávez Montes de Oca (who was a sculptor and print maker who repaired religious images) as a printer and a bookbinder. In 1928, as a teenager, Tomás decided to move to Mexico City to pursue a career in art and teaching at the Escuela Normal Superior and also to connect with his brother, José. His father, who wanted to discourage Tomás from this decision, gave him only two pesos when Tomás asked for money to help him on his new journey. José and Tomás faced a difficult financial situation in Mexico City, having no place to sleep until granted permission by Fernando Leal to sleep at the Centro Popular de Pintura de Nonoalco where José, and eventually Tomás, took classes. After seeing monolith carvings at the Museum of Archaeology, Tomás reaffirmed his commitment to sculpture. He was also exposed to the work of Diego Rivera while visiting La Escuela Muralista. Taking experience and skill from El Centro Popular de Pintura Nonoalco, Tomás began teaching modeling and drawing at primary and secondary public schools in Mexico City. At the same time, he was working in the Department of Museology at the Instituto Nacional de Bellas Artes where he helped rescue the work of José Guadalupe Posada. In 1940, he accepted a commission from the Department of Indian Affairs to lead an indigenous boarding school in the Sierra Tarahumara for the Tarahumara people, an experience that impassioned him to indigenous causes. After four years there, he returned to Mexico City to attend the Escuela Normal Superior (Mexico) to study and become a professor in the field of Visual Arts. He graduated in 1948 with a masters of arts education in the Department of Fine Arts and eventually joined the faculty to depart his knowledge of sculpture onto others. In 1968, after 33 years of teaching under the Secretaría de Educación Pública, Tomás moved back to Guanajuato to retire and dedicate himself to his sculpture. Many students sought out his advice during this time, which lead him to start teaching again in 1985, this time, at the Universidad de Guanajuato. Because the University of Guanajuato did not have appropriate facilities, Tomás instructed his students in his own studio. Between 1990 and 1993, Tomás directed the school of fine arts, improving studio facilities and making needed changes that lead to official approval of the visual arts bachelor's degree program. Tomás continued teaching until health problems (diabetes, blindness, and hearing loss) hindered his teaching and, eventually, his sculpting.

Selected works

Commissioned Works

1960       Eagle heads monument

 In 1960, Tomás worked with the Secretariat of Public Education of Mexico to design and execute an educational and cultural monument that commemorated the 150th anniversary of Mexico's independence in 1910. The monument includes 260 concrete eagle heads inscribed with the word “Libertad” which Tomás supervised the casting of. The ministry installed the eagle heads at various locations along the route of Hidalgo the Liberator, or Miguel Hidalgo y Costilla, who is known for “El Grito de Dolores,” the battle cry of the Mexican Independence. The route starts in Dolores Hidalgo, Guanajuato, and ends in Monte de las Cruces in the city of Chihuahua, Chihuahua."Presentan UG Libro Tomás Chávez Morado: El Maestro Escultor." Presentan UG Libro Tomás Chávez Morado: El Maestro Escultor. University of Guanajuato, 27 Jan. 2015. Web. 02 Nov. 2015. <http://www.ugto.mx/noticias/noticias/6793-presentan-ug-libro-tomas-chavez-morado-el-maestro-escultor>. The ministry also held cultural and educational festivals at the site of every eagle head to celebrate the installation. President Adolfo Lopez Mateo and Governor of the state of Chihuahua, Teofilo Borunda, participated by placing bronze plaques on the first and last eagles of the route. Each stele is marked with a plaque inscribed: “Ruta de Hidalgo, 1810-1811, Año de la Patria 1960.”

1964      National shield in marble on the main façade of the National Museum of Anthropology in Mexico City.

1960      Monumento a Jesús Gonzalez Ortega located in the state of Guanajuato.

----         Masks of Jiménez and Guerrero at the Heroes section of the Museo del Caracol and replicas of these for the community of Charco de Pantoja in Moroleón.

1974      Homenaje del Pueblo: Monumento al Padre Hidalgo sculpted with bronze reliefs for the city of Acámbaro.

1976      Sculptures dedicated to Alonso García Bravo (the first urban planner of Mexico City) located at the Plaza de la Merced in Mexico City.

----         Sixteen wood carved boards that are part of the gigantic doors for the Nikko National Park in Shimoimachi, Japan.

1962      493 busts of Ignacio Zaragoza for the primary schools of the Mexican Republic.

Collaborative Works with José Chávez Morado

1958      The frieze and the decoration of the classrooms of the Centro Médico de México D.F., now the Centro Médico Nacional Siglo XXI.

1960      Bronze doors titled Componentes Raciales y Culturales del Mexico Moderno at the Museo del Caracol in Mexico City.

1964      El Paraguas (The Umbrella) bronze column located in the central courtyard of the National Museum of Anthropology in Mexico City.

 Approximately two months before the 1964 grand opening of the National Museum of Anthropology, José and Tomás Chávez Morado were commissioned to design and execute the veneer for the central court yard column. The 11 meters tall column is often referred to as El Paraguas, or Umbrella, a function of the piece, which appears to hold a cantilevered roof over the courtyard, protecting visitors from the rain. The piece is titled Imagen de Mexico, or Image of Mexico, and highlights “an Indian head and the head of a Spanish person that coalesce into a new race. In modern times, the atom [represents] the struggle for peace.”

1968         Imagen de México (Image of Mexico) bronze column located at the entrance of the historic estate Sunnylands, the former winter home of Walter and Leonore Annenberg.

Other Works

1982      Monumento a la Victoria de los Liberales Sobre los Conservadores, a gift to the city of Silao.

1961      Homenaje a los Constructores de la Ciudad de Mexico, the main piece of an exhibition produced by the Salon of Mexican Plastic Arts.

----         Maquette of the City of Guanajuato and its Surroundings for the permanent exhibitions hall at the Museo Regional de la Alhóndiga de Granaditas.

Exhibitions
Tomás Chávez Morado has exhibited independently and collectively in multiple locations including Galería de la Arte Plástica Mexicana, Galería Merckuper, Galería Chapultepec, Galería Posada, Galería Romano, Galería Misrachi; and in Mexican cities including Morelia, Michoacán, León, Silao, Irapuato, San Francisco del Rincón, Celaya, and Aguascalientes. His paintings have been exhibited in cities such as León, Celaya, Guanajuato, Silao, and Romita . There is a permanent collection of his works at the Museo del José y Tomás Chávez Morado in Silao, Guanajuato. His works have shown posthumous in exhibitions, such as in Deseando lo real Austria Contemporánea in October, 2012, and Formas de Libertad at the University of Guanajuato in August, 2014.

List of Exhibitions

Sources
Gabriela Mijangos.Tomás Chávez Morado: Escultor. México, D. F.: La Rana, 2003. Print.

Vázquez Figueroa, María De Jesús.Tomás Chávez Morado: El Maestro Escultor. Guanajuato: Universidad De Guanajuato, 2014. Print.

References

1914 births
2001 deaths
20th-century Mexican painters
Mexican male painters
20th-century Mexican sculptors
20th-century Mexican male artists